John McCarthy (born 1815 in Fermoy) was an Irish clergyman and bishop of the Roman Catholic Diocese of Cloyne. He was ordained in 1842. He was appointed bishop in 1874. He died in 1893.

References 

1815 births
1893 deaths
People from Fermoy
Roman Catholic bishops of Cloyne
19th-century Irish bishops